VIGR may refer to:

 Gwalior Airport
 GPR157, GPCR receptor